A Man Called Horse is a 1970 Western film directed by Elliot Silverstein, produced by Sandy Howard, and written by Jack DeWitt. It is based on the short story "A Man Called Horse" by the Western writer Dorothy M. Johnson, first published in 1950 in Collier's magazine and again in 1968 in Johnson's book Indian Country. The basic story was used in a 1958 episode of the television series Wagon Train, titled "A Man Called Horse". The film stars Richard Harris as the titular character, alongside Judith Anderson, Jean Gascon, Manu Tupou, Corinna Tsopei, Dub Taylor, and James Gammon.

Partially spoken in Sioux, the film tells the story of an English aristocrat who is captured by the Sioux people. The film was a Mexican-American co-production filmed on location in Arizona and the Mexican states of Durango and Sonora. It received generally positive critical reviews, and was a financial success, spawning two sequels; The Return of a Man Called Horse (1976) and Triumphs of a Man Called Horse (1983).

Plot
English aristocrat John Morgan is captured, enslaved, and treated like an animal by a Native American tribe. He comes to respect his captors' culture and gain their respect. He is aided in understanding the Sioux by another captive, Batise, the tribe's half-breed fool, who had tried to escape and was hamstrung behind both knees.

Determining that his only chance of freedom is to gain the respect of the tribe, he overcomes his repugnance and kills two warriors from the neighboring enemy Shoshone tribe, which allows him to claim warrior status. After his victory, he proposes marriage to one of the women with the horses taken in battle as bride-price and undergoes painful initiation rites, taking the native name "Shunkawakan" (or "Horse") as his Sioux name.

When one of the warriors takes a vow never to retreat in battle, Morgan's changing perspective is shown, as he turns angrily on the uncomprehending Batise, telling him, "Five years you've lived here, and you've learned nothing about these people – all his death is to you is a means of escape". After successfully helping to fend off an attack by the enemy tribe, he becomes a respected member of the tribe and ultimately their leader.

Cast
 Richard Harris as John Morgan / Shunkawakan
 Dame Judith Anderson as Buffalo Cow Head
 Jean Gascon as Batise
 Manu Tupou as Yellow Hand
 Corinna Tsopei as Running Deer
 Dub Taylor as Joe
 James Gammon as Ed
 William Jordan as Bent
 Eddie Little Sky as Black Eagle
 Lina Marín as Thorn Rose
 Tamara Garina as Elk Woman
 Manuel Padilla Jr. as Leaping Buck
 Iron Eyes Cody as Medicine Man
 Sonny Skyhawk (Sonny Roubideaux) as Yellow Hand

Production
For the crucial Native American initiation ceremony (Vow to the Sun), wherein actor Richard Harris is hung on pins in his chest, make-up artist John Chambers created a prosthetic chest.

Harris and Silverstein clashed during filming, and when Howard and Harris reunited on Man in the Wilderness, Howard hired Richard Sarafian.

Sequels
Two sequels to the original film were made, both with Harris reprising his role:
 The Return of a Man Called Horse (1976)
 Triumphs of a Man Called Horse (1983)

Representation of cultures
The film notably treats both sides dispassionately, from the view of neither the White man nor the American Indian nations, but encompassing both cultures, but some Indian activists criticized the film harshly. Buffy Sainte Marie said: Even the so-called authentic movies like A Man Called Horse — that's the whitest of movies I've ever seen. Vine Deloria, Jr. said: As we learned from movies like A Man Called Horse, the more 'accurate' and 'authentic' a film is said to be, the more extravagant it is likely to be in at least some aspects of its misrepresentation of Indians.

It was the first American Western to attempt to portray the Sioux as the protagonists and eulogize their culture, but fell short with Native American audiences because it still had leading White actors as the main characters for the film to appeal to White audiences.

DVD
A Man Called Horse was released to DVD by Paramount Home Entertainment on April 29, 2003, as a Region 1 widescreen DVD and on May 31, 2011, as a Blu-ray disc.

See also
 Dances with Wolves
 List of American films of 1970

References

External links
 
 
 
 

1970 films
1970 Western (genre) films
American Western (genre) films
Cinema Center Films films
Films about Native Americans
Films based on American novels
Films based on Western (genre) novels
Films based on short fiction
Films based on works by Dorothy M. Johnson
Films directed by Elliot Silverstein
Films scored by Leonard Rosenman
Films shot in South Dakota
Lakota-language films
Mexican Western (genre) films
1970s English-language films
1970s American films
1970s Mexican films